Juston Burris (born August 4, 1993) is an American football safety for the Carolina Panthers of the National Football League (NFL). He played college football at NC State and was drafted by the New York Jets in the fourth round of the 2016 NFL Draft.

High school career
Burris was selected to the NCPreps.com 4A all-state and All-conference teams in his senior season. He scored 11 touchdowns and had just under 1,000 receiving yards, 40 tackles and three interceptions in his senior year.

College career
At NC State, Burris started 28 straight games at cornerback. As a junior, he was sixth on the team in tackles and led the team in pass break ups.

Professional career

New York Jets
On April 30, 2016, Burris was drafted by the New York Jets in the fourth round (118th overall) in the 2016 NFL Draft.

On September 10, 2017, in the season opener against the Buffalo Bills, Burris recorded an interception off of quarterback Tyrod Taylor. Burris's play occurred on the Jets' own 8-yard line and ended a long opening drive from the Bills.

On October 27, 2018, Burris was waived by the Jets and was re-signed to the practice squad.

Cleveland Browns
Burris was signed off the Jets' practice squad by the Cleveland Browns on November 7, 2018.

On April 1, 2019, Burris re-signed with the Browns. He was waived on September 1, 2019.

Oakland Raiders
On September 13, 2019, Burris signed with the Oakland Raiders, but was waived six days later.

Cleveland Browns (second stint)
Burris was claimed off waivers by the Cleveland Browns on September 20, 2019.
In week 11 against the Pittsburgh Steelers on Thursday Night Football, Burris sacked Mason Rudolph once and intercepted a pass thrown by Rudolph in the 21–7 win.

Carolina Panthers
On March 20, 2020, Burris signed a two-year, $8 million contract with the Carolina Panthers. He was named the Panthers starting safety to start the season. He started the first six games before suffering a ribs injury in Week 6. He was placed on injured reserve on October 20, 2020. He was activated on November 14, 2020.

Burris entered the 2021 season as the Panthers starting strong safety. He was placed on injured reserve on September 28, 2021. He was activated on November 13.

On March 24, 2022, Burris re-signed with the Panthers on a one-year deal. He was released on August 30, 2022 and signed to the practice squad the next day. He was promoted to the active roster on October 5.

References

External links
Carolina Panthers bio
NC State Wolfpack bio

1993 births
Living people
American football cornerbacks
Carolina Panthers players
Cleveland Browns players
NC State Wolfpack football players
New York Jets players
Oakland Raiders players
Players of American football from Raleigh, North Carolina
Ed Block Courage Award recipients